Butterfield Landing is a location in Weston, Aroostook County, Maine.

External links 
Website
 

Towns in Aroostook County, Maine
Towns in Maine